The 1st Critics' Choice Documentary Awards were presented on November 3, 2016 at the BRIC House in Brooklyn, New York, honoring the finest achievements in documentary filmmaking and non-fiction television. This was the inaugural ceremony for these awards, presented by the Critics Choice Association. The nominees were announced on October 10, 2016.

Winners and nominees

Films by multiple nominations and wins

The following films received multiple nominations:

The following films received multiple awards:

See also
89th Academy Awards
69th Primetime Emmy Awards

References

2016 film awards
Critics' Choice Documentary Awards